Jean Bernard (26 May 1907 in Paris – 17 April 2006 in Paris) was a French physician and haematologist. He was professor of haematology and director of the Institute for Leukaemia at the University of Paris. After graduating in medicine in Paris in 1926 he commenced his laboratory training with the bacteriologist Gaston Ramon at the Pasteur Institute in 1929.

In 1932 Bernard gave the first description of the use of high dosage radiotherapy in the treatment of Hodgkin's disease. Bernard's research has ranged from the demonstration of neoplastic nature of leukaemia (1933–1937) to the formulation of methods of treatment. Bernard gave his name to Bernard's syndrome and Bernard–Soulier syndrome. In all, Bernard published 14 textbooks and monographs on haematology.

During the German occupation of France, Bernard was active in the French Resistance. 

In 1973, he became a member of the Académie Nationale de Médecine; he was elected at the Académie française on 18 March 1976.

In 1981 he was elected as a member of Serbian Academy of Sciences and Arts in the Department of Medical Sciences. In 1983, he was awarded the Artois-Baillet Latour Health Prize.

References

External links
 Washington Post "Leading French Medical Pioneer Dies at 98" April 21 2006 accessed April 22 2006
 Who Named It Jean Bernard
  L'Académie française

1907 births
2006 deaths
Physicians from Paris
Members of the Académie Française
French hematologists
French medical writers
Lycée Louis-le-Grand alumni
Member of the Academy of the Kingdom of Morocco
Members of the French Academy of Sciences
Members of the Serbian Academy of Sciences and Arts
Grand Croix of the Légion d'honneur
Fellows of the Australian Academy of Science